Ernst Ludwig Ehrlich (27 March 1921 – 21 October 2007) was a Swiss Jewish religious philosopher.

Ehrlich fled Nazi Germany for Switzerland in June 1943, using a false passport. From 1961 to 1994 he was European director of the Jewish organisation B'nai B'rith.

He was an adviser to German Cardinal Augustin Bea at the Second Vatican Council in preparing "Nostra aetate", a key document on Roman Catholic-Jewish relations.

He died at his home in Riehen, a suburb of Basel.

References

Sources
Obituary in The Times, 29 October 2007

1921 births
2007 deaths
Writers from Berlin
Jewish emigrants from Nazi Germany to Switzerland
20th-century German philosophers
Jewish philosophers
Officers Crosses of the Order of Merit of the Federal Republic of Germany
German male writers
People from Riehen
20th-century Swiss philosophers